Maciste and the Silver King's Daughter is a 1922 German-Italian silent epic film directed by Luigi Romano Borgnetto and starring Bartolomeo Pagano, Helena Makowska and Ludwig Hartau. It was one of a series of films featuring the character of Maciste.

Cast
 Bartolomeo Pagano as Maciste
 Helena Makowska
 Ludwig Hartau
 Hans Junkermann
 Otto Treptow
 Heinrich Peer
 Kurt Lilien
 Gerhard Ritterband

References

Bibliography
 Roy Kinnard & Tony Crnkovich. Italian Sword and Sandal Films, 1908–1990. McFarland, 2017.

External links

1922 films
Films of the Weimar Republic
German silent feature films
Italian silent films
Films directed by Luigi Romano Borgnetto
German black-and-white films
German epic films
Italian epic films
Maciste films
Silent adventure films
1920s German films